Sisyrolepis is a genus of flowering plants belonging to the family Sapindaceae.

Its native range is Indo-China to Malaysian Peninsula.

Species:
 Sisyrolepis muricata (Pierre) Leenh.

References

Sapindaceae
Sapindaceae genera